Cristian Javier Simari Birkner (born 4 October 1980 in San Carlos de Bariloche) is an Argentinian alpine skier. He competed in the 2002, 2006 and 2010 Winter Olympics. He served as Argentina's flag bearer at the 2010 Winter Olympics opening ceremony. and followed in 2014 as flagbearer. He is the brother of fellow alpine skiers María Belén Simari Birkner and Macarena Simari Birkner.

References

External links 
 
 
 
 

1980 births
Living people
Argentine male alpine skiers
Olympic alpine skiers of Argentina
Alpine skiers at the 2002 Winter Olympics
Alpine skiers at the 2006 Winter Olympics
Alpine skiers at the 2010 Winter Olympics
Alpine skiers at the 2014 Winter Olympics
Sportspeople from Bariloche
Argentine people of Italian descent
Argentine people of German descent